Angelo Mangiarotti (26 February 1921 – 2 July 2012) was an Italian architect and industrial designer. His designs were mostly for industrial buildings and railway stations. In 1994 he received the Compasso d'Oro award of the Associazione per il Disegno Industriale for his lifetime of achievement.

Life and work 

Mangiarotti was born in Milan in 1921. He studied architecture at the Politecnico di Milano, graduating in 1948. 

In 1953 he was a visiting professor at the Design Institute of the Illinois Institute of Technology. While in Chicago he came into contact with Frank Lloyd Wright, Walter Gropius, Ludwig Mies van der Rohe and Konrad Wachsmann.

He held a number of teaching positions, many of them outside Italy. In 1989 he established an architectural practice in Tokyo.

In 1994 he received the Compasso d'Oro award of the Associazione per il Disegno Industriale for his lifetime of achievement.

He died in Milan on 2 July 2012.

Work 

His architectural work included many industrial buildings, among them projects in Padova in 1959, in Marcianise and in Mestre in 1962, in Monza in 1964, and in Cinisello Balsamo in 1973. He also designed a number of railway stations, among them the Milano Certosa and Milano Rogoredo for the Ferrovie dello Stato between 1982 and 1988, and the Porta Venezia and Repubblica stations on the Passante Ferroviario di Milano between 1983 and 1996.

Books 

References

Further reading 

 Various Authors, "Maestri del Design. Castiglioni, Magistretti, Mangiarotti, Mendini, Sottsass", Bruno Mondadori, 2005
 Toto – Gallery MA, "Angelo Mangiarotti, un percorso-MA-un incontro", Tokyo, 2004
 Beppe Finessi, "su Mangiarotti – architettura, design, scultura", Abitare Segesta Cataloghi, 2002
 Luciano Caramel, "Il DNA della scultura. Angelo Mangiarotti", Internazionale Marmi e Macchine Carrara, 1999
 Francois Burkhardt, "L'aspetto artistico nell'opera di Mangiarotti", Domus, n.807, September 1998, pp. 104–110
 Thomas Herzog (Ed.), "Bausysteme von Angelo Mangiarotti", Verlag Das Beispiel GmbH, Darmstadt, 1998
 Guido Nardi, "Angelo Mangiarotti", Maggioli Editore, Rimini, 1997
 Enrico D. Bona, "Mangiarotti", Sagep, Genova, 1988
 Angelo Mangiarotti, M.Luchi, L.Bonesio, L.Magnani, "In nome dell'architettura", Jaca Book, Milano, 1987
 Enrico D. Bona, "Angelo Mangiarotti: il processo del costruire", Electa, Milano, 1980
 Ichiro Kawahara, "Angelo Mangiarotti 1955–1964", Seidoh-Sya Publishing Co., Tokyo, 1964

1921 births
2012 deaths
Illinois Institute of Technology faculty
20th-century Italian architects
Italian industrial designers
Architects from Milan
Polytechnic University of Milan alumni
Academic staff of the Polytechnic University of Milan
Compasso d'Oro Award recipients